The 1967 World Table Tennis Championships mixed doubles was the 29th edition of the mixed doubles championship.  

Nobuhiko Hasegawa and Noriko Yamanaka defeated Koji Kimura and Naoko Fukazu in the final by three sets to one.

Results

See also
List of World Table Tennis Championships medalists

References

-